The Boston mayoral election of 1861 took place on Monday, December 9, 1861, and saw the reelection of Joseph Wightman.

Results

See also
List of mayors of Boston, Massachusetts

References

Mayoral elections in Boston
Boston
Boston mayoral
19th century in Boston